The UK Albums Chart is one of many music charts compiled by the Official Charts Company that calculates the best-selling albums of the week in the United Kingdom. Before 2004, the chart was only based on the sales of physical albums. This list shows albums that peaked in the Top 5 of the UK Albums Chart during 1957, as well as albums which peaked in 1956 but were in the top 5 in 1957. The entry date is when the album appeared in the top 5 for the first time (week ending, as published by the Official Charts Company, which is six days after the chart is announced).

Nineteen albums were in the top five this year. High Society credited to Various artists was released in 1956 but did not reach its peak until 1957. Three artists scored multiple entries in the top 5 in 1957 (excluding albums by Various artists). Nat King Cole and Tommy Steele were the artists who achieved their first UK charting top 5 album in 1957.

The 1956 Christmas number-one album, The King and I credited to Various artists, remained at number one for the first eight weeks of 1957. The first new number-one album of the year was High Society credited to Various artists. Six different albums peaked at number-one in 1957, with Frank Sinatra and albums credited to Various artists (2) having the most albums hit that position.

Background

Multiple entries
Nineteen albums charted in the top 5 in 1957, with thirteen albums reaching their peak this year.

Three artists scored multiple entries in the top 5 in 1957. Frank Sinatra scored five top-ten albums, Elvis Presley entered the top 10 on four occasions and Billy Haley and the Comets secured two spots.

Chart debuts
Two artists achieved their first top 5 album in 1957 as a lead artist.

The following table (collapsed on desktop site) does not include does not include acts who had previously charted as part of a group and secured their first top 10 solo album, or featured appearances on compilations or other artists recordings.

Soundtrack albums
The cast recording from The Tommy Steele Story reached the top five in 1957, peaking at number one.

Top-five albums
Key

Entries by artist
The following table shows artists who achieved two or more top 5 entries in 1957, including albums that reached their peak in 1956. The figures only include main artists, with featured artists and appearances on compilation albums not counted individually for each artist. The total number of weeks an artist spent in the top ten in 1957 is also shown.

Notes

 Songs for Swingin' Lovers re-entered the top 5 at number 5 on 5 January 1957 (week ending) and at number 5 on 9 February 1957 (week ending).
 Rodgers and Hammerstein's Carousel re-entered the top 5 at number 4 on 12 January 1957 (week ending) for 3 weeks and at number 5 on 20 April 1957 (week ending). It also appeared in the expanded top 10 for one week at the end of 1959, and two further weeks in 1960, for a total of 28 weeks in the top 10 overall.
 Recordings credited to Original Soundtrack by the Official Charts Company but all had different artists as featured performers.
 Rodgers and Hammerstein's Oklahoma! re-entered the top 5 at number 5 on 12 January 1957 (week ending) for 37 weeks, at number 5 on 23 November 1957 (week ending) and at number 5 on 14 December 1957 (week ending) for 10 weeks. It also returned to the top 5 for five weeks in 1958, appeared in the expanded top 10 for a further six weeks that year, another eleven weeks in 1959, fifteen weeks in 1960 and eight weeks in 1961. This gave it a total of 112 weeks in the top 10 overall.  
 Rock Around the Clock re-entered the top 5 at number 4 on 2 February 1957 (week ending).
 Rock N' Roll No. 2 was re-issued by RCA Victor in 1962 and re-appeared in the expanded top 10 from 15 December 1962 (week ending) for fourteen weeks, including a second week at its peak of number 3 on 26 January 1963 (week ending). This gave it a total of 17 weeks in the top 10 overall.
 Love Is the Thing re-entered the top 5 at number 5 on 27 July 1957 (week ending) for 5 weeks.
 The Tommy Steele Story re-entered the top 5 at number 5 on 22 June 1957 (week ending) for 18 weeks and at number 5 on 9 November 1957 (week ending) for 2 weeks.
 Loving You re-entered the top 5 at number 5 on 22 February 1958 (week ending).
 A Swingin' Affair re-entered the top 5 at number 4 on 11 January 1958 (week ending) and at number 5 on 1 February 1958 (week ending) for 2 weeks.
 Figure includes album that peaked in 1956.

See also
1957 in British music
List of number-one albums from the 1950s (UK)

References
General

Specific

External links
1957 album chart archive at the Official Charts Company (click on relevant week)

United Kingdom top 5 albums
Top 5 albums
1957